Wapack National Wildlife Refuge is a National Wildlife Refuge of the United States located in southern New Hampshire. It was the state's first refuge and was established through a donation by Lawrence and Lorna Marshall in 1972.

A  segment of the  Wapack Trail passes through the refuge and provides wide views of the surrounding mountains.

The refuge lies in the towns of Greenfield, Lyndeborough, and Temple, and is administered by the Parker River National Wildlife Refuge in Newburyport, Massachusetts.

Nature
The refuge protects diverse habitat types, including northern hardwood-conifer, hemlock-hardwood, and spruce-fir forests and woodlands, oldfields, scrub-shrub habitat, and rock ledges with talus.

Birds
The refuge is a popular hawk migration area and provides nesting habitat for numerous migratory songbirds such as the American tree sparrow, Swainson's thrush, magnolia warbler, crossbills, pine grosbeaks and white-throated sparrow.

Other birds observed on the refuge during a 2002 breeding season survey:

Ovenbird
Hermit thrush
Red-eyed vireo
Canada warbler
Blackpoll warbler
Bay-breasted warbler
Black-throated blue warbler
Black-throated green warbler
Blackburnian warbler
Golden-crowned kinglet
Scarlet tanager
Rose-breasted grosbeak
Yellow-bellied sapsucker
Red-tailed hawk
Sharp-shinned hawk
Peregrine falcon
Ruffed grouse

Mammals
The refuge provides habitat for many mammal species, some of which include:

Red squirrel
Gray squirrel
White-footed mouse
Deer mouse
Woodland vole
Porcupine
Eastern chipmunk
White-tailed deer
Moose
Snowshoe hare
Bobcat
Gray fox
Red fox
Coyote
Black bear

Reptiles and amphibians
Some amphibian species on the refuge:

Red back salamander
Red-spotted newt
American toad
Spring peeper
Pickerel frog
Bullfrog
Leopard frog
Painted turtle
Wood turtle
Milk snake
Garter snake
Ribbon snake

Invertebrates
Invertebrates on the refuge are a food source for many other animal species. Insects in the area include butterflies, dragonflies, beetles, wasps, and ants.

References
Refuge website

National Wildlife Refuges in New Hampshire
Protected areas established in 1972
Protected areas of Hillsborough County, New Hampshire
1972 establishments in New Hampshire